Jørgen Leth (born 14 June 1937) is a Danish poet and film director who is considered a leading figure in experimental documentary film making. Most notable are his documentary A Sunday in Hell (1977) and his surrealistic short film The Perfect Human (1968). He is also a sports commentator for Danish television and is represented by the film production company Sunset Productions.

Early life
Born on 14 June 1937 in Aarhus, Denmark, Leth studied literature and anthropology in Aarhus and Copenhagen and was a cultural critic (jazz, theatre, film) for leading Danish newspapers from 1959 to 1968. His interest in Polish anthropologist Bronisław Malinowski had a profound influence on his work. He traveled in Africa (1961), South America and India (1966) and Southeast Asia (1970–71). His first book was published in 1962. He has written 10 volumes of poetry and eight non-fiction books.

Film career
Leth made his first film in 1963 and has since made 40 more, many distributed worldwide. His most acclaimed is a 1968 short, The Perfect Human, which also featured in the 2003 film The Five Obstructions made by Leth and Lars von Trier. Leth's sports documentaries bring an epic, almost mythic, dimension to the field, as seen in Stars and Watercarriers (Stjernerne og Vandbærerne) (1973) and A Sunday in Hell (En forårsdag i helvede) (1977).

He has been a creative consultant for the Danish Film Institute (1971–73, 1975–77) as well as chairman of the institute's board (1977–82). He has also been a professor at the Danish National Film School in Copenhagen, at the State Studiocenter in Oslo and has lectured at UCLA, Berkeley, Harvard and other American universities.

Leth covered the Tour de France for Denmark's TV 2 from 1988 until 2005 as the expert commentator in partnership with journalist Jørn Mader, and again from 2009 in partnership with Dennis Ritter and Rolf Sørensen. In 1999, he was appointed Danish honorary consul in Haiti.

Controversy
He attracted controversy in Denmark after publication of his autobiography Det uperfekte menneske (The Imperfect Human). It included a graphic account of sexual relations with the 17-year-old daughter of his cook in Haiti. This created a media storm in Denmark, partly because of his plan to make a film called Det Erotiske Menneske ("The Erotic Human"), funded by the Danish Film Institute, in collaboration with DR (Danmarks Radio) and Nordisk Film and TV Commission. The controversy upset several groups in Denmark. In October 2005, due to the controversy, he was dismissed as commentator with TV2. Leth then considered to quit finishing his film Erotic Man, but close friend and fellow filmmaker Lars von Trier met with Leth and promised to let himself credit as executive producer on the film, in order to support Leth's artistic work. Erotic Man premiered at the Toronto International Film Festival in September 2010. The film received lacklustre reviews which deemed it "dirty-old-man cinema" and colonialist exploitation.

Personal life
Leth has been married three times and has four children: Asger (film director), Karoline, Kristian and Tomas.

Leth moved to Haiti in the late 1980s and referred to it as his second home. He lived in Jacmel from 1991 until 2010, when the Haiti earthquake destroyed his rented home and most of his possessions. In 2013, Leth was still living in Haiti for about six months of the year, but with friends on the northern coast.

Honors
Retrospectives of Leth's work have been held at the National Film Theatre in London (1989), in Rouen, France (1990), at the American Film Institute in Washington D.C. (1992), in Mumbai, India (1996), New York (2002), Sao Paulo (2003), Toronto (2004), Florence (2005), Rome (2006), Sao Paulo (2008), Warsaw (2008) and Tehran (2008) and at the Athens International Film Festival in Athens (2009).

He has been the recipient of numerous awards, including:
1971 Oberhausen Hauptpreis
1972 Thomas Mann Award
1983 Danish Academy Special Prize
1992 Paul Hammerich Award
1995 Drachmann Award for literary oeuvre
1996 Danish Film Academy Robert Award
1997 Prix de France for cultural reporting from France
1999 Danish State Art Foundation Special Award
2000 Danish Film Academy Robert Award
2004 Grand Prix for Best Feature at Odense International Film Festival
2009 Honorary Bodil award for lifetime achievement
2022 Member of the Ordre des Arts et Lettres of France
Lifelong grant from the Danish state for achievements in filmmaking

Selected bibliography

Two biographies of Leth have been published in Denmark.

 Gult lys (Yellow Light) (1962) – poems
 Kanal (Channel) (1964) – poems
 Lykken i Ingenmandsland (Happiness in No-man's Land) (1967) – poems
 Sportsdigte (Sports Poems) (1967) – poems
 Glatte hårdtpumpede puder (Smooth, Inflated Cushions) (1969) – poems
 Eventyret om den sædvanlige udsigt (The Adventure of the Usual View) (1971) – radio play
 Eddy Merckx i nærheden af en kop kaffe (Eddy Merckx in the Vicinity of a Cup of Coffee) (1973)
 Det går forbi mig (It Passes Me) (1975) – poems
 Det skete ved Ballerup (It happened near Ballerup) (1975) – short story
 Det er ligesom noget i en drøm. Udvalgte historier om cykelsport 1970–75 (It's like Something in a Dream: Selected Stories about bicycle sport 1970–75) (1976)
 Filmmaskinen. Udvalgte historier om film 1965–78 (The Film Machine. Selected Stories about Films 1965–78) (1979)
 Jeg leger at jeg kan alting. En børnebog (I play that I can do everything. A Children's Book) (1991)
 Hundene gør. Kup i Haiti 1991–94 (The Dogs Bark. Coup in Haiti 1991–94) (1994) – documentary
 Den gule trøje i de høje bjerge (The Yellow Jersey in the High Mountains) 1995 – collection of writings about cycling
 Billeder fra Haiti. Jørgen Leth's collection (Pictures from Haiti – Jørgen Leth's Collection) – catalogue of art
 Billedet forestiller (The Picture Shows) (2000) – poems
 Historier fra Haiti (Stories from Haiti) (2000)
 Samlede digte (Collected Poems) (2002)
 Det uperfekte menneske. Scener fra mit liv (The Imperfect Man. Scenes from My Life) (2005) – memoires
 Det gør ikke noget (It Doesn't Matter) (2006) – poems
 Guldet på havets bund. Det uperfekte menneske/2 (The Gold at the Bottom of the Sea. The Imperfect Human/2) (2007)
 One Day Duke Jordan Disappeared in Harlem (2008) – articles about jazz 1954–66
 The Gifts of Chance (2009) – essays about filmmaking
 Haiti (2010) – documentary
 Trivial Everyday Things: Selected Poems of Jørgen Leth (BookThug, 2011) – translations into English by Martin Aitken

Filmography
 Stopforbud, 1963
 Look Forward to a Bright Future, 1965
 The Perfect Human, 1968
 Near Heaven, Near Earth, 1968
 Ophelia's Flowers, 1969
 Motion Picture, 1970
 The Search, 1970
 The Deergarden, the Romantic Forest, 1970
 Chinese Table-tennis, 1970
 Life in Denmark, 1971
 Stars and Watercarriers, 1973
 Klaus Rifbjerg, 1974
 Good and Evil, 1974
 A Sunday in Hell, 1977
 Peter Martins – A Dancer, 1978
 Kalule, 1979
 Dancing Bournonville, 1979
 66 Scenes from America, 1982
 Step on Silence, 1981
 Pelota, 1983
 Haiti Express, 1983
 Moments of Play, 1986
 Notebook from China, 1986
 Notes on Love, 1989
 Danish Literature, 1989
 Traberg, 1992
 Michael Laudrup – A Football Player, 1993
 Haiti, Untitled, 1996
 I'm Alive – Soren Ulrik Thomsen, Poet, 1999
 Dreamers, 2002
 New Scenes from America, 2002
 The Five Obstructions (with Lars von Trier), 2003
 Aarhus (2005)
 Erotic Man (2010)
 I Am Talking To You (2013)
 Pelota II (with Olatz Gonzalez Abrisketa), 2015

Discography
Han er nu malet blå, 2004.
Vi sidder bare her - Vi sidder bare her..., 2008
Vi sidder bare her - Ikke Euforisk, 2010
Ingen Regning Til Mig, 2014

References

External links

 Official blog
 
 Interview from Danish Film Institute:Tidsskriftet FILM
 The Perfect Human

1937 births
Danish emigrants to Haiti
Danish experimental filmmakers
Danish documentary filmmakers
20th-century Danish poets
Danish male poets
Danish male screenwriters
Danish documentary film directors
English-language film directors
French-language film directors
Living people
People from Aarhus
People from Jacmel
Spanish-language film directors
Sports commentators
21st-century Danish poets
20th-century Danish male writers
21st-century Danish male writers
Bodil Honorary Award recipients